Kalateh-ye Mir Al (also Romanized as Kalāteh-ye Mīr Āʿl; also known as Kalāteh-ye Mīr ‘Alam) is a village in Forumad Rural District, in the Central District of Meyami County, Semnan Province, Iran. At the 2006 census, its population was 115, in 31 families.

References 

Populated places in Meyami County